Vishal Kudawla (born 17 July 1984), known professionally as Vishnu Vishal, is an Indian actor and producer who appears in Tamil film industry. After a brief career in cricket, he started his acting career in the year 2009 playing the lead role in the sports film Vennila Kabadi Kuzhu, winning acclaim for his portrayal. Vishnu won further acclaim for his role in Neerparavai (2012), portraying a fisherman. He rose to fame with the psychological thriller film, Ratsasan (2018).

Early life and family
Vishnu Vishal was born on 17 July 1984 to Ramesh Kudawla, a high-ranking Tamil Nadu police officer. He finished his schooling in Campion Anglo-Indian Higher Secondary School in Tiruchirappalli. After completing his MBA in marketing from SRM Institute of Science and Technology, he went on to become a cricketer, playing in TNCA league games. However, a leg injury ended his cricket career and the actor noted that during the time he was bedridden, he started watching films and began an interest in an acting career. His father's uncle had been an actor in several small films and he shaped Vishnu's interest in the industry. He entered the film industry changing his name to Vishnu to which he later added his birth name.

Career

2009–2014
After being offered a role by Anand Chakravarthy in Suseenthiran's directorial debut Vennila Kabadi Kuzhu, Vishnu spent months preparing for the role. He had to tan his body sitting for hours in the sun to get dark and look like a player and then for 3 months he trained for kabbadi matches under a coach, for five hours a day. The film opened to very positive reviews, with Vishnu earning a nomination from the Vijay Awards for Best Debut Actor. He had two releases in 2010, portraying an action role in the comedy Bale Pandiya and then played a rowdy from Royapuram in Drohi. He subsequently worked on the comedy, Kullanari Koottam,  After a year without any releases, he had two releases in 2014: the romantic comedy Mundasupatti under Thirukumaran Entertainment and the sports drama Jeeva for which he collaborated with Suseenthiran again. Both films won positive reviews and performed well at the box office.

2015–2018

In 2015, he appeared in the science and fiction comedy Indru Netru Naalai directed by R.Ravikumar. The movie was a super hit at the box office. Vishnu had two releases in 2016. His first release of the year was also his first production venture, the comedy film Velainu Vandhutta Vellaikaaran directed by Ezhil, with Nikki Galrani in the female lead. The movie was one of the most profitable ventures at the box office. His final release of the year was Maveeran Kittu, a period drama set in the 1980s. Despite receiving positive reviews, the movie did well at the box office. He finished shooting for Seenu Ramasamy's Idam Porul Yaeval. 
His next films are Katha Nayagan (2017), Raatchasan (2018) and Silukkuvarupatti Singam (2018) directed by a first time film maker, Chella.

2021–present
In 2021, the Prabhu Solomon's Kaadan has received mixed reviews from the audience and critics alike. Vishnu Vishal is known for his choice of scripts in different genres that make every film of his unique for his fans.  His FIR (2022) too follows in the same vein touching the sensitive issue of branding muslims as terrorist. Vishnu Vishal has delivered one of his best performances in his career through this film. FIR, which is to hit screens on February 11, 2022 gets banned in Malaysia, Kuwait & Qatar. In the same year, the actor has his family entertainer Gatta Kusthi lined up for release on December 2nd. The film has Aishwarya Lekshmi playing the female lead, and is co-produced by Ravi Teja under his home banner RT Teamworks. Vishnu plays a wrestler in this film which is also releasing in Telugu as Matti Kusthi.

Personal life

Vishnu Vishal was married to Rajini Natraj, daughter of the actor K. Natraj. The two were college-mates and were in a relationship for four years before getting married. Their wedding took place on 2 December 2010 at Hotel Asiana in Chennai, and their son was born in 2017. In November 2018, the couple divorced due to undisclosed reasons.

Vishnu got engaged to badminton player Jwala Gutta in September 2020. Their wedding took place on April 22, 2021 in Hyderabad.

Filmography

References

External links
 

 Vishnu Vishal Biography, Physical Status, Age, Height, Education, Family, Girl Friend, Favourite Things, Movies, and More

Tamil male actors
Male actors from Chennai
Living people
1984 births
Actors in Tamil cinema
Indian film actors